Scrophularia canina, the dog figwort or French figwort, is a species of flowering plant in the family Scrophulariaceae.

Description

Scrophularia canina have a growth form that supports itself and are usually herbaceous perennials. This species has simple and broad leaves, square stems with small two lipped flowers borne in loose terminal clusters.

Distribution
Scrophularia canina is found in most of southern and central Europe, and in north Africa. Seed dispersal is affected by wind gusts and plant structure.

Uses
It has been used be used in a phytoremediation experiment and has proven to be a more efficient accumulator of lead than Pistacia lentiscus.

References

canina
Flora of Central Europe
Flora of Southwestern Europe
Flora of Southeastern Europe
Flora of the Crimean Peninsula
Flora of North Africa
Flora of the East Aegean Islands
Flora of Turkey
Taxa named by Carl Linnaeus
Plants described in 1753